The  is a light rail line owned by Iyotetsu. The line is composed of a main line between Dōgo Onsen and Nishi-Horibata and a branch line between Heiwadōri 1-chōme and Kamiichiman. The two lines runs entirely within the city of Matsuyama, Ehime Prefecture, Japan.

History 
The Matsuyama Electric Railway was merged with Iyotetsu in 1921, who continued to operate the line.

Operations
The line is electrified with overhead lines. The main line is double-tracked, while the branch line is single-tracked. Five light rail services, along with the heritage railway train Botchan, run on the line.

Stations
: Stations served by the heritage railway train Botchan

References

Railway lines in Japan
Rail transport in Ehime Prefecture
Railway lines opened in 1911